Hamzeh is a corvette serving in the Northern Fleet of the Islamic Republic of Iran Navy. It was originally named Chahsavar and was built as the royal yacht of Reza Shah, before being converted into a warship.

Design
Chahsavar was noted for its special design and considered among the most luxurious yachts in the world.

Dimensions and machinery
She was equipped with two seven-cylinder two-stroke cycle single-acting diesel engines, provided by Gebr. Stork, of Hengelo. Additionally, she was fitted with a hoist provided by The American Engineering Company.

Reconstruction
The ship was refitted in 1956 by Cantiere navale del Muggiano.

After reconstruction, Hamzeh is classified as a corvette. It has also been variously described as a training ship, a miscellaneous auxiliary ship (AG) or a patrol craft (PBO).

Service history 
Hamzeh rejoined the Iranian fleet in January 1998.

See also

 List of ship launches in 1936
 List of current ships of the Islamic Republic of Iran Navy

References

External links 

1936 ships
Ships built in the Netherlands
Active corvettes of Iran
Royal and presidential yachts
Pahlavi dynasty